A narrative technique (known for literary fictional narratives as a literary technique, literary device, or fictional device) is any of several specific methods the creator of a narrative uses to convey what they want—in other words, a strategy used in the making of a narrative to relay information to the audience and particularly to develop the narrative, usually in order to make it more complete, complex, or interesting. Literary techniques are distinguished from literary elements, which exist inherently in works of writing.

Setting

Plots

Perspective

Style

Theme

Character

See also 
 Plot device

Notes

References 
 

 
Narratology
Poetic devices
Style (fiction)